Paratheocris haltica is a species of beetle in the family Cerambycidae. It was described by Karl Jordan in 1903, originally under the genus Theocris. It is known from Gabon.

References

Theocridini
Beetles described in 1903